Citigroup Pty Ltd (trading as Citi Australia) was the Australian subsidiary of Citigroup. The bank operated consumer banking services (as Citibank Australia), including credit cards, savings and transaction accounts, loans, insurance, and self-managed superannuation funds (SMSF), as well as private, corporate and investment banking, and wealth management.

Citibank Australia was opened in 1985 and was one of the first foreign banks to be granted a banking licence in Australia, besides being one of the largest international banks in the country. Since 2001, the national headquarters have been located at the Citigroup Centre, Sydney.

Citibank had major centres in Melbourne, Perth and Brisbane and employed a total of about 1,200. Its parent company, Citigroup, has around a million customers in Australia and New Zealand, along with approximately 900 local corporate and institutional clients. Mark Woodruff is the Chief Executive Officer.

History
In 1985, Citibank was granted a banking licence in Australia. In 1999, Diners Club Australia was acquired by Citibank. Citigroup Centre was opened in 2001 in  Sydney. In 2002, Citigold was launched. The next year, Salomon Smith Barney joined up with Citibank Corporate Bank to form the Citigroup Global Corporate and Investment Banking Group. In 2009, following a massive bailout of its parent Citigroup Inc by the United States government in 2008 following the subprime mortgage crisis, Citigroup announced in January 2009 that the parent would be separated into "bad bank" Citi Holdings (comprising the bank's brokerage, consumer finance and troubled assets) and Citicorp. Citicorp, the "good bank," will consist of retail banking, business banking and credit cards. Citigroup announced on 27 January 2009 that Michael Corbat, former head of Citigroup's brokerage business, will head Citi Holdings.

In April 2021, Citigroup announced that it will exit its consumer banking operations in 13 markets, including Australia, with its investment banking division remaining operational in the country. On 9 August 2021, Citigroup announced its agreement to sell its Australian consumer banking division to the National Australia Bank (NAB), for A$1.2 billion (US$882 million). On 25 November 2021, the Australian Competition & Consumer Commission (ACCC) approved NAB's proposed acquisition of Citi Australia's consumer banking division. The sale was completed on 1 June 2022, and its authorised deposit-taking institution (ADI) licence was revoked by the Australian Prudential Regulation Authority on 30 June 2022.

Divisions

Prior to NAB's acquisition of its consumer banking business, Citibank Australia comprised the consumer group division of its parent company, Citi Australia. The other two divisions of Citi were markets and banking, and wealth management.

Citi Global Consumer Group: This division performed retail banking operations, largely through online and telephone banking. Most notably, this division also issued Citi-branded, as well as white-label credit cards (examples included Coles, Kogan, and Qantas-branded credit cards), and Diners Club-branded cards. Due to its online presence, deposits and telling services were offered through NAB and Australia Post's Bank@Post service.
Citi Markets and Banking: This division of Citi performed a multitude of functions, including underwriting equity and debt, advice on mergers and acquisitions and providing services in cash management, custodial, foreign exchange, trade and treasury.
Citi Global Wealth Management: This division of Citi included Citi Private Bank, Citi Smith Barney and Citi Investment Research.

Sponsorship and corporate social responsibility 
Citi Australia had various financial education and environmental programs to serve local communities in Australia.  Its program Making Cents geared towards helping parents and teachers instruct children about the basics of money management.  Another program funded by Citi was Hip Pocket, a workshop for teenagers in Year 10 and 11 which helped them to understand finances and be educated consumers.  Finally, Citi has provided funding for an organisation called Learning Links with a program called Counting for Life, which helps children with difficulties in learning math.

As part of its corporate social responsibility (CSR) Citi Australia had engaged in various initiatives such as reducing its energy and paper use; supported companies that use alternative energy, and undertook research on the impact of climate change on trade and industry.  It had become an “Action for Climate Change” partner with Conservation Volunteers Australia, which involved having events for Citibank employees in which they are educated about climate change, which opened up opportunities for employees to take part in conservation efforts, and provided funding for tree planting.

Citibank Australia also supported a children’s hospice in New South Wales called Bear Cottage, as well as The Shepherd Centre, a centre for hearing impaired children. It was part of the Australian Business Community Network, which helped public schools through initiatives such as mentoring programs and career fairs.

Citibank Australia was a major sponsor of the Sydney Swans AFL club.

See also 
 Banking in Australia
 List of banks
 List of banks in Australia
 List of banks in Oceania

References

External links
 Home page

Citigroup
Australian subsidiaries of foreign companies
Australian companies established in 1985
Banks established in 1985
Financial services companies based in Sydney
1985 establishments in Australia